Ectoedemia quinquella is a moth of the family Nepticulidae. It is found from Great Britain and France to Italy, Bulgaria and Greece.

The wingspan is 4.2-5.6 mm. Head dark fuscous. Antennal eyecaps whitish. Forewings dark bronzy-fuscous; a transverse spot on costa before middle, a triangular spot on dorsum before tornus, and a discal spot at 3/4 shining silvery white. Hindwings rather dark grey. Adults are on wing in the second half of June and early July. There is one generation per year. 

The larvae feed on Quercus petraea, Quercus pubescens and Quercus robur. They mine the leaves of their host plant. The mine consists of a strongly contorted corridor. There are often multiple mines in a single leaf. Pupation takes place outside of the mine.

References

External links
Fauna Europaea
bladmineerders.nl
A Taxonomic Revision Of The Western Palaearctic Species Of The Subgenera Zimmermannia Hering And Ectoedemia Busck s.str. (Lepidoptera, Nepticulidae), With Notes On Their Phylogeny

Nepticulidae
Moths of Europe
Moths described in 1848